Čadca railway station is the main station serving the municipality and district town of Čadca, in the Žilina Region, northern Slovakia. Opened in 1871, the station forms part of the cross border Žilina–Čadca–Svrčinovec zastávka–Mosty u Jablunkova railway, and is also a junction station for two other lines, one of them also cross border.

The station is currently owned by Železnice Slovenskej republiky (ŽSR); train services are operated by Železničná spoločnosť Slovensko (ZSSK).

Location
Čadca railway station is situated on Staničná street, a short distance to the north of, and across the river from, the town centre.

History
The station was opened on 8 January 1871, upon the inauguration of the Český Těšín–Žilina section of the Košice–Bohumín Railway.

Facilities
Due to its original architecture, the station building has been nicknamed Chata ("the chalet") by locals. It houses ticketing facilities and a restaurant.

Train services
Čadca railway station is the junction of the following Slovak railway lines:

127 Žilina–Čadca–Svrčinovec zastávka–Mosty u Jablunkova (ČD) (part of the Košice–Bohumín Railway)
128 Čadca–Makov
129 Čadca–Skalité Serafínov–Zwardoň (PKP)

As it is close to the Czech Republic and Poland, the station offers services to several destinations in these countries. For the Czech Republic, there are many trains to Ostrava, Bohumin and Prague, and to Poland, there are trains towards the border crossing at Skalité/Zwardoń.

Interchange
The station offers interchange with local buses.

Services

See also

History of rail transport in Slovakia
Rail transport in Slovakia

References

External links

 Čadca railway station on vlaky.net 

Railway Station
Railway stations in Žilina Region
Railway stations opened in 1871
Buildings and structures in Žilina Region
Railway stations in Slovakia opened in the 19th century